Zanthoxylum clava-herculis, the Hercules' club, Hercules-club, pepperwood, or southern prickly ash, is a spiny tree or shrub native to the southeastern United States. It grows to 10–17 m tall and has distinctive spined thick, corky lumps 2–3 cm long on the bark. The leaves are glabrous and leathery,
pinnately compound, 20–30 cm long with 7-19 leaflets, each leaflet 4–5 cm long. The flowers are dioecious, in panicles up to 20 cm long, each flower small, 6–8 mm diameter, with 3-5 white petals. The fruit is a two-valved capsule 6 mm diameter with a rough surface, and containing several small black seeds.  The tree has also been called Z. macrophyllum.  The genus name is sometimes spelled Xanthoxylum.

Along with the related Zanthoxylum americanum, it is sometimes called "toothache tree" or "tingle tongue" because chewing on the leaves, bark, or twigs causes a tingling numbness of the mouth, tongue, teeth and gums. It was used for such medicinal purposes by both Native Americans and early settlers to treat toothache because of this.

The tree has a rounded crown and requires plentiful water and sunlight. Its leaves are browsed by deer and its fruit is eaten by birds.
The fruit passes through birds, which helps the seeds to germinate.
The new trees tend to
sprout below the favorite resting places of the birds, along fence rows and the edge of woods.
It is known to be host to a number of insect species, including the Giant Swallowtail (Papilio cresphontes) and the leaf beetle Derospidea brevicollis.

Potentially confused species
The name Hercules' club is also applied to Aralia spinosa, also native to eastern North America.  Unlike Zanthoxylum, Aralia has large twice-compound leaves and very large leaf scars, so the trees are easily distinguished.

Chemistry
The benzophenanthridine alkaloid chelerythrine is the major active natural product found in Z. clava-herculis, exhibiting anti-bacterial activity against Staphylococcus aureus.

References

External links
 Zanthoxylum clava-herculis fact sheet
 Kew Plant List
 Z. clava-herculis - Oklahoma University biosurvey
 Z. clava-herculis - Plants for a Future database
 IPNI Listing

clava-herculis
Endemic flora of the United States
Trees of the Southeastern United States
Flora of Florida
Flora of Texas
Plants described in 1753
Taxa named by Carl Linnaeus